= Mark Failla =

American nutritionist

Mark L. Failla is an American health nutritionist, focusing in digestion, absorption, intestinal metabolism, bioactive compounds, gut health and bioavailability, currently a professor emeritus at Ohio State University and an Elected Fellow of the American Association for the Advancement of Science.

== Early life and education ==
Failla graduated from Indiana University Bloomington.
